O. formosa may refer to:

 Olindias formosa, a western Pacific jellyfish
 Otites formosa, a picture-winged fly
 Oxycera formosa, a soldier fly